Don't Eat the Neighbours (also known as Big Teeth, Bad Breath) is a children's comedy series that originally aired in the United Kingdom and Canada in 2001-2002.  It was filmed mainly with puppets, but occasionally used computer graphics.  The series was focused on the characters Rabbit, Wolf, and their children.  Music for the show was done by Jim Guttridge, with the theme done by Dan Gagnon, Sandy Nuttgens, and Michael Scott.

Only four episodes were released on VHS and DVD in the 2001 volume A Rabbit for All Seasons.

Plot outline 
Rabbit lives in a forest in England with his children: Lucy, Peter, and Emily.  Wolf, who has been driven out of Canada by the Brotherhood of Wolves, moves in next door with his sons Barry and Simon. Although Wolf has a strong desire to eat Rabbit, his children develop close friendships with Lucy, rejecting traditional dietary preferences.

List of characters 
Where the children have normal names, the adult characters are named after the animals they are.

Rabbit (Voiced by Robert Lindsay) – Rabbit is confident, clever and quick-witted. A lot of the series' humour is based around the conflict between him, Wolf and Fox.  He is also the widowed father of Lucy, Peter, and Emily. Rabbit is tall and wears blue trousers, red converse shoes, a white shirt and a flowery jacket. It is mentioned in the series that Rabbit's wife was eaten by a wolf.
Lucy (Voiced by Doon Mackichan) – Rabbit's oldest child, Lucy is calm, and often come across as smarter than her father. She is good friends with Barry and Simon, despite the conflict between their fathers.
Peter and Emily (Voiced By Frank Welker) – Rabbit's youngest children are twin babies. Due to their age, they do not speak in any episodes.
Wolf (Voiced by Michael McShane) – Exiled from his native Canada by the Brotherhood of Wolves, Wolf has relocated to a forest in England where he lives next door to Rabbit.  He is dim-witted and clumsy (though has occasional moments of brilliance) and often teams up with Fox in his attempts to catch Rabbit.  Wolf is also the father of Barry and Simon. Wolf can prove to be dangerously angry and scary at times when it comes to planning on both hunting and killing his prey. He is tall and wears a red shirt, black leather pants a jacket and platform-like shoes which resemble women's boots. It is mentioned in the series that Wolf's wife left him for another wolf.
Simon (Voiced by Patrick McKenna) – Wolf's oldest son, Simon is smarter than his brother Barry, though is not all that bright himself.
Barry (Voiced by Seán Cullen) – Wolf's youngest son. Barry is good-hearted but rather dim-witted. He has a small crush on Lucy.
Fox (Voiced by Simon Callow) – Wolf's posh friend sometimes talks to his mother, who appears to be a voice inside his head. Like Wolf, Fox too is an enemy of Rabbit and regularly tries to eat him. Fox can be very clever when it comes to devising schemes to catch Rabbit, though Rabbit usually manages to foil his plans. He wears a white shirt, yellow waist coat jacket and dark pants.
Terrapin (Voice by Tim McInnerny) – Rabbit's best friend. Terrapin is very cowardly, although there have been occasions when he has shown courage. His twin brother, Colin, looks exactly like him, save for his moustache. Terrapin wears an underdiver's water suit and flippers.
Bear (Voiced by Simon Callow) – Lucy's confidant and advisor, he is often seen painting. Barry and Simon are frightened of him, though he has a kindly personality. Rabbit and Terrapin are also scared of him.
Sheep – The Sheep in the show are Wolf's lunch & dinner that he always tries to catch one by one if they are in his way.

Episodes 

"A Rabbit for All Seasons"
"Action Rabbit"
"Barry Loves Lucy"
"Simon the Werewolf"
"Walk like a Rabbit"
"Trust Rabbit"
"Lucy and Woodland Massive"
"Vote for Lucy"
"Wolves in from the Cold"
"Dances with Terrapin"
"Fox Comes to Stay"
"Colin Pays a Visit"
"Old Father Rabbit"
"Lucy the Adventurer"
"Dave Eats the Grass"
"Barry's Close Encounter"
"Terrapin's Hot Date"
"Happy Birthday Mr Rabbit"
"Terrapin on the Rocks"
"Super Terrapin"
"Lucy Blows Her Top"
"Wolf's Grave Fears"
"Terrapin Out of His Shell"
"Lucy Faces the Music"
"Simon Acts Up"
"Rabbit's Greatest Hits"

References

External links
 

2001 British television series debuts
2002 British television series endings
2000s British children's television series
2000s British comedy television series
2001 Canadian television series debuts
2002 Canadian television series endings
2000s Canadian children's television series
2000s Canadian comedy television series
British children's comedy television series
British television shows featuring puppetry
Canadian children's comedy television series
Canadian television shows featuring puppetry
English-language television shows
ITV children's television shows
Television series about children
Television series about rabbits and hares
Television series about wolves
Television series by ITV Studios
ITV comedy
YTV (Canadian TV channel) original programming